Death of the Reprobate (33.4 x 19.6 cm) is an oil on panel painting by a follower of Hieronymus Bosch which depicts the deathbed struggle for the human soul between an angel and a demon. It is held in a private collection in New York City, United States.

The painting is likely a copy of detail from a larger hell panel. It dates from the second half of the 16th century.

The style is somewhat similar to his Death of the Miser.

References

Paintings by Hieronymus Bosch
Paintings about death
Birds in art
Angels in art